Route 213 is a state highway in southeastern Connecticut, running in a fishhook pattern from central Waterford to downtown New London via the shoreline.

Route description
Route 213 begins as Great Neck Road at an intersection with Route 156 in Waterford center. It heads south toward Long Island Sound, soon crossing over the Amtrak railroad tracks, then turning east at Goshen Cove after another two miles (3 km). It soon passes by the entrance to Harkness Memorial State Park then cuts northeast across the shore along Niles Hill Road, crossing Alewife Cove into the city of New London. In New London, it turns north following Ocean Avenue through the southwestern part of the city to end at an intersection with US 1 in the downtown area.

History
In the 1920s, the road from downtown New London to Ocean Beach Park (Ocean Avenue from Route 1) was designated as a secondary state highway known as Highway 340. In the 1932 state highway renumbering, Ocean Avenue (old Highway 340) and an extension north of U.S. Route 1 along Jefferson Avenue up to Route 85 was designated as Route 213. In 1963, the southern terminus was moved westward to its current location. In 1972, the northern terminus was moved to Colman Street (modern US 1), with Route 213 ending at a junction with I-95 (then co-signed as US 1). In 1974, Colman Street became one-way southbound and the northbound route was shifted several blocks east to Jefferson Avenue. In 1976, with the rerouting of US 1 to its current location, Route 213 was truncated at its northern end to the current northern terminus.

Junction list

References

External links

213
Transportation in New London County, Connecticut